Oncești is a commune in Maramureș County, Maramureș, Romania. It is composed of a single village, Oncești, part of Bârsana Commune until being split off in 2004.

References

Communes in Maramureș County
Localities in Romanian Maramureș